Miroslav Wiecek (4 November 1931 in Ostrava – 12 July 1997) was a Czech football player.

Wiecek played most of his career for Baník Ostrava. He played 325 matches and scored 174 goals in the Czechoslovak First League, four times becoming the best goalscorer of the league.

He played one match for Czechoslovakia national team, in October 1953 against Hungary.

References 
  ČMFS entry

1931 births
1997 deaths
Czech footballers
Czechoslovak footballers
Czechoslovakia international footballers
Czech people of Polish descent
FC Baník Ostrava players
MFK Vítkovice players
Sportspeople from Ostrava
Association football forwards